130 km is a rural locality (a passing loop) in Cheremichkinskoye Rural Settlement of Topkinsky District, Russia. The  population was 47 .

Geography 
The passing loop is located on the Yurga-Tashtagol line, 37 km south of Topki (the district's administrative centre) by road. Treshchevsky is the nearest rural locality.

Streets 
 Zheleznodorozhnaya

References 

Rural localities in Kemerovo Oblast